Salhad is one of the 51 union councils (sub-divisions) of Abbottabad District in the Khyber-Pakhtunkhwa province of Pakistan.

The Union Council of Salhad is named after what was the main village of the area, but has now effectively become a suburb of Abbottabad city.
It is situated about two kilometres south of the current city limits of Abbottabad.

Subdivisions

 Salhad
 Khokhar
 Jabarriyaa

References

Populated places in Khyber Pakhtunkhwa
Union councils of Abbottabad District